Poldarsa is a rural locality (a settlement) and the administrative center of Opokskoye Rural Settlement, Velikoustyugsky District, Vologda Oblast, Russia. The population was 1,447 as of 2002. There are 23 streets.

Geography 
Poldarsa is located 66 km southwest of Veliky Ustyug (the district's administrative centre) by road. Poldarsa (village) is the nearest rural locality.

References 

Rural localities in Velikoustyugsky District